Lance Legree (born December 22, 1977 in St. Stephen, South Carolina) is a former American football defensive tackle in the National Football League.  He was signed by the New York Giants as an undrafted free agent in 2001.  He played college football at Notre Dame.

External links
New York Jets bio

1977 births
Living people
People from St. Stephen, South Carolina
American football defensive tackles
American football defensive ends
Notre Dame Fighting Irish football players
New York Giants players
New York Jets players
San Francisco 49ers players
New Orleans Saints players